Mahamaya is a 1944 Indian Tamil-language historical drama film directed by T. R. Raghunath, starring P. U. Chinnappa and P. Kannamba. It was released on 16 October 1944.

Plot 
Mahamaya, the princess of the kingdom of Gandhara and Vikram, the prince of a neighbouring kingdom happen to be pupils of the same teacher (Guru). Mahamaya garlands the sword of Vikram without knowing its implication. When a woman garlands a man's sword, according to the custom prevailed in those times, it is considered that she has become the wife of the sword owner. Vikram knows about her action. After they leave the Ashram of the teacher each marry a different person. Later, Vikram happens to meet Mahamaya. Reminding her that she has chosen him as her husband, he claims that she belongs to him. However, Mahamaya rejects his claim. Vikram abducts Mahamaya but she manage to escape from him. When she goes home, her husband refuses to accept her. Abandoned, Mahamaya kills her child and commits suicide.

Cast 

Male cast
 P. U. Chinnappa as Vikramsimhan
 N. S. Krishnan as Singan
 R. Balasubramanyam as Amarasimman
 D. Balasubramanyam as Nandagupthan
 M. G. Chakrapani as Neelan
 S. V. Sahasranamam as Jayapalan
 T. R. B. Rao as Mahipalan

Female cast
 P. Kannamba as Mahamaya
 T. A. Mathuram as Meera
 M. S. Saroja as Chandralekha
 M. K. Meenalochani as Manorama Devi
 T. D. Kusalambal as Bala

Female dancers
 K. Varalakshmi, T. Rajbala, V. Rajeswari, K. Rajarajeswari, K. S. Sarojini, M. S. Santha, J. Kanni.

Production 
The film was jointly produced by M. Somasundaram and S. K. Mohideen, and directed by T. R. Raghunath and Elangovan; the latter also wrote the screenplay. Cinematography was handled by Marcus Bartley and the film's operative cameraman was Jiten Banerji. Editing was done by A. Kasilingam and audiography by Dinshaw K. Tehrani. Art was handled by F. Nagoor and choreography by M. Meenakshisundaram Pillai and Pandit Bholonath Sharma. Elangovan took almost a year to complete the screenplay. He was not sure how to end the story, so he wrote three endings and left the decision to the producers and the director; all three endings were filmed. The film was shot at Newton Studios.

Soundtrack 
Music was composed by S. V. Venkatrama Iyer and K. S. Venkatarama Iyer while the lyrics were written by T. K. Sundara Vathiyar and Kambadasan. Though there were 10 songs in the film only one ‘Silaye nee ennidam sung by P. U. Chinnappa was a hit.

Release and reception 
Mahamaya was released on 16 October 1944, and distributed by South India Pictures. Although the film was acclaimed by critics for the acting by Kannamba and Chinnappa, audiences at that time did not accept the story because it shows a king going after another person's wife. Therefore, the film did not do well at the box office.

References

External links 
 

1940s Tamil-language films
1944 films
Films directed by T. R. Raghunath
Indian black-and-white films
Indian historical drama films
Jupiter Pictures films
Films scored by Kunnakudi Venkatarama Iyer
Films scored by S. V. Venkatraman